Kelardasht District is a district (bakhsh) in Chalus County, Mazandaran Province, Iran. At the 2006 census, its population was 36,458, in 10,092 families.  The District has two cities: Kelardasht and Marzanabad.  The District has three rural districts (dehestan): Birun Bashm Rural District, Kelardasht Rural District, and Kuhestan Rural District.

Kelardasht correspond to historical Kelarestaq.

References 

Chalus County
Districts of Mazandaran Province